Boogat is a Canadian-Mexican musician from Quebec City, Quebec, whose style blends hip hop with Latin music styles such as cumbia and reggaeton. He won the Juno Award for World Music Album of the Year for his album Neo-Reconquista at the Juno Awards of 2016 and the ADISQ Awards of 2016.

Of Paraguayan and Mexican descent, Boogat was born in Quebec City to immigrant parents and raised in the Beauport borough of the city, then moved to Montreal in 2001 where his career took off.

Performing initially in French, Boogat switched to Spanish after playing with the Latin music group Roberto Lopez Project and electro producer Poirier. He released his first full-length Spanish album El Dorado Sunset in 2013. The album won two Prix Félix for Best World Music Album and Producer of the Year at ADISQ 2013.

Neo-Reconquista, which includes collaborations with La Yegros, Sonido Pesado and Pierre Kwenders, was released in 2015. Exclaim! gave the album an 8/10, noting that Boogat has "long moved past being known simply as a "Spanish-language rapper from Quebec" and who has committed to a more textured artistic evolution and genre-agnostic growth".

In 2017, San Cristóbal Baile Inn, an album recorded and produced in Mexico which includes collaborations with Andrés Oddone, Frikstailers, Miss Bolivia, Niña Dioz, and Lemon Bucket Orkestra, was released.

”El Gato y Los Rumberos”, an acoustic EP inspired by the Latino Big Bands era of the 1920s to the 1950s, was released in 2020.

Discography
Triste et belles histoires (2004)
Patte de salamandre (2006)
Rmx Volume 1 (2008)
Que pegue Duro y Violento (2010)
Esperanto Sound System (2011)
Esa Mujer (2011)
Pura Vida EP (2011)
El Dorado Sunset (2013)
Sunset Remixes(2014)
Neo-Reconquista (2015)
San Cristóbal Baile Inn (2017) nominated for 2019 Juno Award
Aquí Remixes EP (2018)
El Gato y Los Rumberos (2020)

References

External links

21st-century Canadian rappers
Canadian world music musicians
Musicians from Quebec City
Canadian people of Mexican descent
Canadian people of Paraguayan descent
French-language singers of Canada
Spanish-language singers of Canada
Juno Award for Global Music Album of the Year winners
Canadian male rappers
21st-century Canadian male musicians